Pedro Weingärtner (26 July 1853 – 26 December 1929) was an important Academic painter of Brazil, and the first artist born in Rio Grande do Sul to win international praise for his work.

Biography
Born in Porto Alegre, to a family of German immigrants, he began his artistic career as an amateur, helped by his brother Inácio, who was a lithographer, and possibly also by the painter Delfim da Câmara. In 1878 he moved to Germany in order to study in the Grossherzoglich Badische Kunstschule, in Karlsruhe. There he became a pupil of Ferdinand Keller, Theodor Poeckh and Ernst Hildebrand. In 1880 Keller moved to Berlin, being followed by Weingärtner, who then enrolled in the local Academy.

In 1882 he left Germany for France, studying in the Académie Julian under Tony Robert-Fleury and William-Adolphe Bouguereau. Wrecked by financial issues, he thought of abandoning his studies, but such situation was reverted by supportive friends, including Baron of Itajubá, who got for him a special scholarship from Emperor Pedro II upon Bouguereau's advice. Then he could further his education in Rome.

Thereafter for many years he divided his time between Rio de Janeiro, Porto Alegre and Rome, traveling very often and being celebrated as one of the most important Brazilian painters of his generation. In Rio Grande do Sul he was a star. In 1920 he was back in Porto Alegre, where the remained until death. His fame declined from 1925 on, facing competition from new painters and changing tastes in local art.

He devoted all his efforts to a half-Realist half-Romantic approach to Academicism even while such styles were already being severely challenged by Modern tendencies. Major themes in his work were mythological scenes, landscapes and genre paintings focusing mainly immigrants and the gaucho, the folk type of Rio Grande do Sul people.

Selected paintings

See also
Brazilian painting
Academicism
Realism
Romanticism

References

Damasceno, Athos. Artes Plásticas no Rio Grande do Sul. Porto Alegre: Editora Globo, 1971. pp. 196–216.

External links 

 pinacoteca.org.br
 masp.art.br

1853 births
1929 deaths
Brazilian romantic painters
Brazilian people of German descent
Realist painters
19th-century Brazilian painters
19th-century Brazilian male artists
20th-century Brazilian painters
20th-century Brazilian male artists
Académie Julian alumni